Thomas Holte (by 1500 – 23 March 1546) was an English politician.

He was a Member (MP) of the Parliament of England for Warwick in 1529.

References

1546 deaths
English MPs 1529–1536
Year of birth uncertain